Jukka Markus Koskilahti (born 23 May 1954) is a Finnish former ice hockey player who played for Sweden clubs HV 71 (1979–1980) and Modo AIK (1980–1982) as well as TPS Turku.

References

External links
Jukka Koskilahti at Eliteprospects 
Jukka Koskilahti at Hockey Database 

1954 births
Living people
Finnish ice hockey left wingers
Ice hockey players at the 1980 Winter Olympics
Olympic ice hockey players of Finland
Sportspeople from Turku